The 2021–22 Czech Cup, known as the MOL Cup for sponsorship reasons, was the 29th season of the annual knockout football tournament of the Czech Republic. It began with the first round on 23 July 2021.

Preliminary round 

|colspan="3" style="background-color:#D0D0D0" align=center|23 July 2021

|-
|colspan="3" style="background-color:#D0D0D0" align=center|24 July 2021

|-
|colspan="3" style="background-color:#D0D0D0" align=center|25 July 2021

|-
|colspan="3" style="background-color:#D0D0D0" align=center|31 July 2021

First round 

|colspan="3" style="background-color:#D0D0D0" align=center|10 August 2021

|-
|colspan="3" style="background-color:#D0D0D0" align=center|11 August 2021

|-
|colspan="3" style="background-color:#D0D0D0" align=center|18 August 2021

Second round 
The draw took place on August 17, 2021.

|colspan="3" style="background-color:#D0D0D0" align=center|24 August 2021

|-
|colspan="3" style="background-color:#D0D0D0" align=center|25 August 2021

|-
|colspan="3" style="background-color:#D0D0D0" align=center|1 September 2021

|-
|colspan="3" style="background-color:#D0D0D0" align=center|2 September 2021

|-
|colspan="3" style="background-color:#D0D0D0" align=center|7 September 2021

|-
|colspan="3" style="background-color:#D0D0D0" align=center|8 September 2021

|-
|colspan="3" style="background-color:#D0D0D0" align=center|14 September 2021

Third round 
The draw took place on September 10, 2021.

|colspan="3" style="background-color:#D0D0D0" align=center|21 September 2021

|-
|colspan="3" style="background-color:#D0D0D0" align=center|22 September 2021

|-
|colspan="3" style="background-color:#D0D0D0" align=center|6 October 2021

|-
|colspan="3" style="background-color:#D0D0D0" align=center|7 October 2021

Fourth round 
The draw took place on October 14, 2021.

|colspan="3" style="background-color:#D0D0D0" align=center|26 October 2021

|-
|colspan="3" style="background-color:#D0D0D0" align=center|27 October 2021

|-
|colspan="3" style="background-color:#D0D0D0" align=center|11 November 2021

|-
|colspan="3" style="background-color:#D0D0D0" align=center|12 November 2021

|-
|colspan="3" style="background-color:#D0D0D0" align=center|23 November 2021

|-
|colspan="3" style="background-color:#D0D0D0" align=center|15 December 2021

Quarter-finals 

|colspan="3" style="background-color:#D0D0D0" align=center|9 February 2022

|-
|colspan="3" style="background-color:#D0D0D0" align=center|15 February 2022

|-
|colspan="3" style="background-color:#D0D0D0" align=center|16 February 2022

Semi-finals 

|colspan="3" style="background-color:#D0D0D0" align=center|3 March 2022

|-
|colspan="3" style="background-color:#D0D0D0" align=center|26 March 2022

Final

References

External links 
Season on soccerway.com
MOL Cup

Czech Cup seasons
Cup
Czech